Ula or ULA may refer to:

Entertainment 
 Ula (poetry)
 Ula (dance), an ancient Tongan dance
 Ula, the former title for film Chithiram Pesuthadi 2
 Ulster Liberation Army, in the Tom Clancy novel Patriot Games

Military
 Ula (weapon), a Fijian club
 Ula-class submarine, Norway
 HNoMS Ula (1943), a WWII Norwegian submarine
 HNoMS Ula (S300), two Norwegian submarines

Organizations
 Underground Literary Alliance, a writers society
 Union Latino Americana, 1930s
 United Launch Alliance, a space launch service provider
 United League of Arakan, the political wing of the Arakan Army, Myanmar
 United Left Alliance, Ireland
 Universidad Latinoamericana, a Mexican university
 University of the Andes, Venezuela (Spanish )
 Utah Library Association, US

Places
 Ula (Caria), ancient town, now in Turkey
 Ula, Muğla, Turkey, a district
 Ula, Norway, a village
 Ula, Pöide Parish, Estonia, a village
 Ula, Salme Parish, Estonia, a village
 Al-Ula, Saudi Arabia, an ancient city
 Ūla River, Lithuania and Belarus
 Ula Point, James Ross Island, Antarctica

Technology
 Uncommitted logic array, a type of integrated circuit
 Unique local address, in IPv6
 User license agreement, for software

Given name 
 diminutive of the name Urszula, Ursula
 Ula Ložar (born 2002], Slovenian singer
 Ula Levi, a character in Shortland Street

Other uses
 Ula (fly), a genus of craneflies
 ULA TV, a Venezuelan channel
 A Waco A series biplane
 Fungwa language (ISO 639-3 code), a language of Nigeria

See also
 Ula Ula Division, later Shire of Balonne, Queensland, Australia
 Ulla (disambiguation)